Ecliptica is an album by Sonata Arctica.

Ecliptica may also refer to:
"Eclíptica", a 2008 composition by David Padrós
Ecliptica, a demo by Tristar and Red Sector Incorporated
P. ecliptica, a species of moth of Australia

See also
Ecliptic, the apparent path of the sun on the celestial sphere relative to the Earth's center